William Ellery White (December 16, 1902 – 1964) was a professional football player in the National Football League. He made his NFL debut in 1926 with the Los Angeles Buccaneers. He played only one season in the league.

Notes

1902 births
1964 deaths
Los Angeles Buccaneers players